Pseudocypraea exquisita is a species of sea snail, a marine gastropod mollusk in the family Ovulidae, one of the families of cowry allies.

Description
Original description: (Shell) "thin, small, ovately pyriform; dorsum humped; body whorl with numerous fine, evenly spaced spiral threads; outer lip thickened, smooth, shiny; anterior and posterior terminals well produced, prominent; aperture narrow; columella and base smooth and polished; outer lip with 20 well developed teeth; columella with 24 fine teeth; posterior 5 labial teeth more developed than the others, projecting beyond lip margin; color pale tan with large, irregular patches of wine-red; base white with 2 pale red bands."

Distribution
Locus typicus: "250 metres depth, off Panglao, Bohol Isl., Philippines."

References

Pediculariinae
Gastropods described in 1979